Kagame is a surname. Notable people with the surname include:

Alexis Kagame (1912–1981), Rwandan historian
Ange Kagame (born 1993), Rwandan philanthropist
Jeannette Kagame (born 1962), First Lady of Rwanda
Kayije Kagame (born 1987), Rwandan–Swiss artist and actress
Paul Kagame (born 1957), President of Rwanda
Shyaka Kagamé (born 1983), Rwandan–Swiss filmmaker

See also
 Kagame Inter-Club Cup, a football club competition also known as the CECAFA Club Cup
 Kagami (disambiguation)